Birgit Stauch (Born in Baden-Baden, (Germany), December 11, 1961) is a contemporary German sculptor who works in bronzes, sculptures, sketches and portraits.

Life
Stauch was born in Baden-Baden, Baden-Württemberg, daughter of artist and sculptor, Alexander Stauch. Upon returning from compulsory service during World War II her father studied stone carving as a profession and sculpture as a passion thus inspiring his daughter to follow in his footsteps.

She studied design at the Johann Friedrich Böttger Institute in Selb, Bavaria. She furthered her education as an understudy of Arno Breker (1900–1991) and sculptor Rudolf Alexander Agricola (1912–1990). Stauch also studied drawing under Clarissa Kupferberg (1907–1989). She worked as a creative director in the atelier at Strassackers', Europes' largest art foundry for some 14 years. Returning to Baden-Baden she took over her fathers' stonemasonry business as managing director all the while continuing to create a broad variety of works in addition to teaching sculpture.

Works
Her works include a wide variety of sketches, drawings, stone and bronze sculptures, bronze reliefs, busts such as Käthe Kollwitz, portals, bronze coat of arms, miscellaneous works as well as commissioned pieces.

Stauch created a holocaust memorial commemorating the deportation of 450 Jews from Freiburg to the concentration camp at Gurs, in France, close to the Spanish border on October, 22nd, 1940. Gurs was considered to be a transit point for detainees in transit to Auschwitz.

Public monuments
Till Eulenspiegel, Water Work, Baden-Baden 1986
Memorial, "17. June", Baden-Baden 1989
"Monk" Sandstone, Bad Herrenalb 1991
Public Fountains, Rastatt Rauental 1992, 2002
Public Fountain, Sandweier 1994
Public Fountain, Giengen an der Brenz 1996
Public Foutain Weyhr 1999
Memorial for "Peace, Freedom and Friendship in Europe" Baden-Baden 2007

Bronze portals
Government Palace of the Emir of Qatar 1986
Schmalbach water reservoir 1992
Annaberg water reservoir 1998

References

"Birgit Stauch und Ihre Werke" Badisches Tageblatt, 5 Juli, 1988/Nr. 152
"Ihre Liebe gilt dem Pferd" BNN, Freitag 22 Mai, 1992/Nr.118
Kunst "Off The Main Stream" [sic?] Boulevard Baden-Baden, Ausgabe Frühjahr 1994
"Erinnerung an Deportation" Freiburger Zeitung, 21 Okt. 2003
"Mantel Denkmal, Freiburg Wiwili-Brücke" Badische Zeitung, November 8, 2003
"Kleinplastiken in Bronze und Silber" Badener Tageblatt, Freitag Sep 3, 2004/Nr. 204
"Birgit Stauch kreirt Preis" Badener Tageblatt, Dienstag Sep 4, 2007/Nr. 204

Further reading 
R.A. Agricola, Eduard Roether Verlag, Darmstadt 1971,

External links

 Birgit Stauch Sculptors' Web Site 
 Artists' Blog
 Strassackers' website

1961 births
German sculptors
German women artists
Living people
Modern sculptors
People from Baden-Baden